Team New Balance Boston (TNBB) is a training group of professional distance runners sponsored by New Balance and based out of Boston, Massachusetts. The team is coached by Mark Coogan and was founded in 2014.

Notable Success 
In the 2020 United States Olympic trials TNBB Teammates Elle Purrier St. Pierre and Heather MacLean finished in gold and bronze position with the silver medal going to former teammate Cory McGee. All three ran a new Personal best and Elle set a new Meet Record.

Elle Pierre has set two national records while representing TNBB by running the indoor mile in 4:16.85 on February, 8th 2020 and running the indoor two mile in 9:10.28 on February 13, 2021.

On April 15, 2022, TNBB teammates Heather MacLean and Elle Purrier St. Pierre ran alongside Kendall Ellis and Roisin Willis setting a distance medley relay world record running a time of 10:33.85 at the grand opening of the TRACK at New Balance.

Roster

Men 

 Christian Noble (2022)
 Sean Peterson (2022)
 Drew Piazza (2021)

Women 

 Julie-Anne Staehli (2022)
 Siofra Cleirigh Buttner (2019)
 Katrina Coogan (2016)
 Emily MacKay (2022)
 Heather MacLean (2018)
 Sarah McDonald (2022)
 Millie Paladino (2021)
 Elle Purrier St. Pierre (2018)
 Kristie Schoffield (2022)

Former Members

 Kemoy Campbell (2016–2018)
 Abbey Cooper (2014–2019)
 Liz Costello (2014–2018)
 Emily Durgin (2017–2019)
 Lianne Farber
 Megan Krumpoch
 Cory McGee (2014–2018)
 Natosha Rogers (2014–2017)

References 

Track and field clubs in the United States